State Route 894 (SR 894), also known as Shoshone Road, is a state highway in southeastern White Pine County, Nevada, United States.

Route description

SR 894 beings at the northern end of Indian Springs Fence Line Road in  Shoshone, in an area of the unincorporated community that was formerly the separate unincorporated community of Minerva.

From its southern terminus, SR 894 heads nearly due north on Shoshone Road (a two-lane asphalt paved road) for about  before assuming a north-northwesterly course. About  later, after crossing the Spring and Ridge creeks, SR 894 turns to head due west. (US 93 heads south to Pioche, Caliente, and Las Vegas; and heads north to a junction with US 6/US 50 at Majors Place en route to Ely.)

The entire highway is located on Baking Powder Flat, a flat in the southern part of the Spring Valley. It has multiple named and unnamed minor side and cross roads, but no major intersections.

Major intersections

See also

References

External links

894
Transportation in White Pine County, Nevada